Elmar may refer to:
 Elmar (given name)
 Leitz Elmar, photographic lens
 N. V. Elmar, Power companies of Aruba